James Beresford was a footballer who played in the Football League for Blackburn Rovers.

Playing career
In 1882 Beresford signed for his home town club Staveley. He then moved South and joined an Accrington Football Club called Church F.C. During the 1883-84 season he moved to Accrington and caused them to be expelled from the FA Cup after playing for Accrington in a Cup tie against Rossendale. Accrington won 5-1 and Beresford scored twice. Beresford returned to Church F.C. but was paid to remain on the books of Accrington. The FA find out and charged Accrington with breaking the rules and expelling them from the FA Cup.

James Beresford made his League debut on 15 September 1888, as a winger, at Leamington Road, then home of Blackburn Rovers, against Accrington. The match ended in a 5–5 draw and, Beresford scored his League debut goal by scoring Blackburn Rovers second goal. Beresford played 12, of the 22 League matches played by Blackburn Rovers in season 1888–89 and scored four League goals. As a winger he played in a midfield that achieved big (three-League-goals-or-more) wins on three separate occasions.

References

Year of birth missing
Year of death missing
Place of birth missing
Association football forwards
Staveley F.C. players
Accrington F.C. players
Blackburn Rovers F.C. players
Hyde United F.C. players
English Football League players
English footballers
Church F.C. players